The following is a list of episodes for NBC television drama St. Elsewhere. The series premiered on October 26, 1982, and ended on May 25, 1988. A total of 137 episodes were produced spanning 6 seasons.

Series overview

Episodes

Season 1 (1982–83)

Season 2 (1983–84)

Season 3 (1984–85)

Season 4 (1985–86)

Season 5 (1986–87)

Season 6 (1987–88)

References

External links
List of St. Elsewhere episodes at Internet Movie Database

Lists of American drama television series episodes
Lists of medical television series episodes
St. Elsewhere